Captain Fracasse (French: Le Capitaine Fracasse) is an 1863 novel by the French writer Théophile Gautier. It is an adventure novel set in the seventeenth century. The story has been adapted for film and television numerous times. An 1866 edition of the novel was illustrated by Gustave Doré.

Plot

The novel recounts the story of the baron of Sigognac during the reign of Louis XIII of France (reign 1610-1643), a destitute nobleman who decides to abandon his castle to join a theatrical troupe out of love for a young actress. Leaving his castle in the care of a faithful old steward, he travels with the actors to Paris; his aim being also to meet the king in Paris to ask for financial help in memory of services rendered by his ancestors. When one of the actors dies, the baron replaces him in the company's productions, taking the stage name of Captain Fracasse and, against his proud nature, acting the part of a bumbling military man. He develops humility through the experience, and this in turn deepens his loving relationship with the ingénue.

Adaptations 
List of film adaptations:
 Captain Fracasse (1919)
 Captain Fracasse (1929)
 Captain Fracasse (1940)
 Captain Fracasse (1943)
 Captain Fracasse (1961)
 Captain Fracassa's Journey (1990)

References

External links

Bibliography
 Goble, Alan. The Complete Index to Literary Sources in Film. Walter de Gruyter, 1 Jan 1999.

1863 French novels
French novels adapted into films
Novels about actors
Novels about nobility
Novels by Théophile Gautier
Novels set in the 17th century
Novels set in Early Modern France